Hasana J. Hakenmüller was a German textile company founded on 1. December 1887 in Albstadt-Tailfingen; it ceased operations in December 2000
Its brand name Hasana was concatenated from Hakenmüller and sana (Latin for healthy).

History

Product history 

In 1971 the German Football Association granted Hasana exclusive rights for children's sports- and leisure underwear sporting the logo of each of the 16 teams competing in Bundesliga, Germany's professional football league.
This later led to similar exclusive rights to use the logo of 1974 FIFA World Cup on textiles.

Architecture

Product images

References

External links 

Clothing companies of Germany
German companies established in 1887
Clothing companies established in 1887
German companies disestablished in 2000
Manufacturing companies disestablished in 2000